The following people played for the Panthers for at least one game in the 1926 AFL regular season, the only one of the team's (and the league's) existence:

1 Also played fullback
2 Started 1926 season as coach of Akron Indians, then left to play for Panthers
3 Also played tackle
4 Played wingback and American football
5 Also played guard
6 Position currently known as quarterback

References

 
Cleveland Panthers
Panthers players